The Princes of the Yen is a bestselling book by German development economist Richard Werner.

History 

The book was published in 2003 by Routledge publishers. The book was for many years considered too abstruse and obscure and yet at the same time, it was praised for its technical depth and well-researched nature. All this changed with a documentary adaptation, which has now made the book and its concepts more accessible to the wider world.

Contents 

The book is a thorough investigation of the macroeconomic driving forces behind the so-called Lost Decade, when the Japanese economy performed very poorly despite having witnessed many decades of hyper-growth. The book has been hailed by many for having revealed the backroom dealings and secret plannings of the central bankers of Japan and the world in general.

Adaptations 

The book also owes its popularity to a much-appreciated documentary of the same name written and directed by Michael Oswald and released by Spider's Web Films. The documentary itself has garnered millions of views on YouTube and other social media websites.

See also

 Richard Werner
 Bank of Japan

References

External links
 Princes of the Yen
 Princes of the Yen: Official Documentary Website
 Princes of the Yen (Documentary Film)

History books about Japan
English-language books
Routledge books
2003 non-fiction books